The 2006 Copiapó mining accident occurred on January 20, 2006, when an explosion occurred in the underground Carola-Agustina copper mine in Copiapó, Chile. It was caused by two trucks colliding, and the explosion covered the only escape route for the miners inside the mine.

The explosion caused two deaths and two injuries. Seventy miners were trapped.

Shortly after the explosion occurred, workers at the nearby mine, "Punta de Cobre", began digging a tunnel towards the Carola-Agustina mine to assist in rescuing the trapped miners.
Rescue efforts lasted seven hours, and the 70 trapped miners were rescued alive.

See also 
 2010 Copiapó mining accident

References 

2006 in Chile
Mining disasters in Chile
2006 mining disasters
History of Atacama Region
Labor in Chile
Presidency of Ricardo Lagos
2006 disasters in Chile